The Battle of Wesenberg took place on June 26, 1704 close to Rakvere (Wesenberg) during the Great Northern War. The Swedish cavalry force of 1,400 men under the command of Wolmar Anton von Schlippenbach retreated before Carl Ewald von Rönnes larger force. However, the Swedes were caught at Wesenberg and after a valiant defense they had been close to annihilated with only 400 managing to escape towards Reval the rest was either killed or captured. The Russian losses are unknown.

References

Conflicts in 1704
1704 in Europe
Wesenberg
Wesenberg
Wesenberg
Battles in Estonia
Rakvere